Bradburia hirtella is a North American species of flowering plants in the family Asteraceae, native to Texas and Louisiana in the south-central United States.

Bradburia hirtella is usually annual, with some populations perennial. It is an herb up to 80 cm (32 inches) tall with yellow flower heads. Disc florets are functionally male, the female parts being fertile only in the ray florets.

References

Flora of Texas
Flora of Louisiana
Astereae
Plants described in 1842